Reference Re Amendments to the Residential Tenancies Act (NS), [1996] 1 S.C.R. 186 is a reference question put to the Supreme Court of Canada regarding the ability of the federal government to appoint judges under section 96 of the Constitution Act, 1867.

The Court considered that giving all of the jurisdiction of Superior Courts to other bodies would make s. 96 meaningless. Instead, the Court developed a three-part test to determine whether it is permissible for a provincial government to give powers of a Superior, or "Section 96" Court, to another provincial, or "section 92" court.

Is the power in question something over which Superior Courts had jurisdiction in 1867?
Is the power in question a judicial function, rather than an administrative one?
Is the removal of the judicial power the main point of the exercise, rather than just an ancillary part of a larger reform of the way that the jurisdiction is exercised?

If the answer to all three of these questions is "yes", then it is unconstitutional to remove this power.

External links
 

Supreme Court of Canada cases
1996 in Canadian case law
Landlord–tenant law
Supreme Court of Canada reference question cases
Real property law of Canada